Patryk Rachwał (born 27 January 1981) is a Polish football manager and a former player. He is currently in charge of III liga side KP Starogard Gdański.

Career

Club
In June 2007, he moved to GKS Bełchatów on a three-year contract. In June 2010, he joined Polonia Warsaw on a three-year contract. He was released from Polonia one year later. In July 2011, he signed a two-year contract with Zagłębie Lubin.

International
He was a part of Poland national football team. He has played four times.

Managerial
On 25 June 2021, he was appointed as the new manager of GKS Bełchatów. He was dismissed on 15 November, with the team sitting in the relegation zone.

On 26 April 2022, he took charge of III liga club KP Starogard Gdański.

References

External links
 
 

1981 births
Living people
Górnik Zabrze players
GKS Bełchatów players
Polish footballers
FC Energie Cottbus II players
Widzew Łódź players
Wisła Płock players
Polonia Warsaw players
Zagłębie Lubin players
Ekstraklasa players
Polish expatriate footballers
Expatriate footballers in Germany
Polish expatriate sportspeople in Germany
Sportspeople from Zabrze
Association football midfielders
Poland international footballers
Polish football managers
GKS Bełchatów managers
II liga managers